Olathe Township is one of seven townships in Johnson County, Kansas, USA.  As of the 2010 census, its population was 137,324.
It contains the city of Olathe, Kansas (for which it is named) and 0.53 Square Miles of De Soto, Kansas & Lexington Township, Kansas

Adjacent Townships

 Lexington Township Northwest
 Gardner Township Southwest

Cemeteries

 Olathe Memorial Cemetery
 Asa Smith Cemetery

Emergency Services

Police
 Johnson County Sheriff
 Olathe Police

Fire
 Olathe Fire Department

Medical (EMS)
 Johnson County Med-Act

Transportation

Highways
 
 
 
 
 
 
 
 
  (decommissioned)

Rail
 BNSF Railway Emporia Subdivision
 Union Pacific Railway

Major Roads
 Santa Fe Street (formerly known as )
 Quivira Road
 Metcalf Avenue 
 Parker Street
 Mur-Len/Strang Line Road
 Lackman Road
 Blackbob Road
 Cedar Creek Parkway
 College Parkway

Lakes, Streams & Ponds
 Lake Olathe
 Mill Creek
 Little Mill Creek

Parks
 Ernie Miller Nature Park

Notable Locations
 Johnson County Courthouse
 Olathe Medical Center
 Garmin Headquarters
 Prince of Peace Catholic Church
 Johnson County Airport
 New Century Aircenter

School districts
 Gardner School District 231
 De Soto Unified School District 232
 Olathe Unified School District 233
 Blue Valley School District

External links

Townships in Johnson County, Kansas
Townships in Kansas